Spartocus III was king of the Bosporan Kingdom from 304 to 284 BC. He succeeded to the throne after the death of his father Eumelus in a carriage accident.

Reign
Spartocus inherited the throne from his father in 304 BC, after his father's unexpected death during his return from Sindia. Upon assuming the throne, he became the first Bosporan ruler to take the title of Basileus, likely following the example of contemporary Hellenistic kings such as the Antigonids, Lysimachids, Seleucids and Ptolemies. As soon as the Athenian trade was liberated from Demetrius, Spartocus sought to renew his relationship with Athens, which had already been trade partners with the Bosporan Kingdom in the reign of his great-grandfather Leukon. Spartocus received Athenian honors, thanking him and his predecessors for maintaining good relations with Athens.

Succession

Spartocus died in 284 after ruling for twenty years. He was succeeded by Paerisades II, who may have been the son of Satyrus II who escaped and survived Eumelus' slaughter of the family, but may also have been Spartocus' own son.

See also
Kingdom of Macedon
Ptolemaic Egypt
Seleucid Empire
Lysimachus

References 

Monarchs of the Bosporan Kingdom
284 BC deaths
4th-century BC monarchs
3rd-century BC monarchs
Ancient Thracian Greeks
Spartocid dynasty